Qarah Mohammad (also Romanized as Qarah Moḩammad and Qareh Moḩammad; also known as Kara-Mukhammed and Qarā Moḩammad) is a village in Karasf Rural District, in the Central District of Khodabandeh County, Zanjan Province, Iran. At the 2006 census, its population was 618, in 146 families.

References 

Populated places in Khodabandeh County